Commonwealth Flats is a region of former mud flats in South Boston.  It has been used over the years as the site of the South Boston Naval Annex, the South Boston Army Base, the Black Falcon Cruise Terminal and various other entities over the years.

References

South Boston